Pareiorhina is a genus of armored catfishes native to South America where they are only found in Brazil. These species are known to occur at altitudes above 650 metres (2100 ft) in various rivers of the Grande, Paraíba do Sul, São Francisco and Tietê River basins. This genus was first erected by Gosline in 1947 as a monotypic genus to include Rhinelepis rudolphi. It was not until 2003 that a second species, P. carrancas, was described. The third species, P. brachyrhyncha was described in 2005. Pareiorhina forms a monophyletic subunit with Neoplecostomus within the subfamily Neoplecostominae.

Species
There are currently 7 recognized species in this genus: 
 Pareiorhina brachyrhyncha Chamon, Aranda & Buckup, 2005
 Pareiorhina carrancas Bockmann & A. C. Ribeiro, 2003
 Pareiorhina cepta Roxo, G. S. C. Silva, Mehanna & C. de Oliveira, 2012 
 Pareiorhina hyptiorhachis G. S. C. Silva, Roxo & C. de Oliveira, 2013 
 Pareiorhina pelicicei Azevedo-Santos & Roxo, 2015 
 Pareiorhina rosai G. S. C. Silva, Roxo & Oyakawa, 2016 
 Pareiorhina rudolphi (A. Miranda-Ribeiro, 1911)

Description

Pareiorhina species all have lateral borders of the head without developed bristles, a naked abdomen, dorsal plates meeting along the mid-dorsal line between the dorsal and caudal fins, no adipose fin, ventral plates covering the midventral line, and the dorsal portion of body behind
dorsal fin flatenned (flat caudal peduncle with a rectangular cross section). In P. carrancas and P. rudolphi, the teeth are simple, while in P. brachyrhyncha, the teeth have a minute lateral cusp at the base of the main cusp. P. brachyrhyncha and P. carrancas are unique in lacking an adipose fin and azygous plates; in loricariids without an adipose fin, it is usually replaced by a series of azygous plates that form a ridge. However, these two species lack both the fin and the ridge. These species range from about 4.1–4.5 centimetres (1.6–1.8 in) in length.

References

Loricariidae
Fish of South America
Catfish genera
Taxa named by William Alonzo Gosline III
Freshwater fish genera